Dêgên is a town of Baingoin County,  Tibet Autonomous Region, People's Republic of China.

It consists of the following eight village-level settlements: 那高查社区, 亚零村, 那色村, 加龙村, 乡那村, 南措村, 南美村, 保雄村.

References

Populated places in Nagqu
Township-level divisions of Tibet